The Moreni oil field is an oil field located in Moreni, Dâmbovița County. It was discovered in 1890 and developed by Petrom. It began production in 1900 and produces oil.

References

Oil fields in Romania